A light tube is used for transporting natural or artificial light for illumination.

Light tube or light pipe may also refer to:
 Waveguide (optics), a device for light transport in photonic devices
 Fluorescent lamp, a tubular light-emitting device
 In professional wrestling, "light tube" refers to a fluorescent lamp used as a weapon in certain hardcore matches.
 LED tube lamps
 ADAT Lightpipe, a protocol for digital audio signals
 Krause-Ogle box, a waveguide (light pipe) used in nuclear testing

See also
 Solar chimney, a ventilation device